The 2023 Indian Wells Masters (branded as the 2023 BNP Paribas Open for sponsorship reasons) was a professional men's and women's tennis tournament played in Indian Wells, California. It was the 49th edition of the men's event and 34th of the women's event and was classified as an ATP Tour Masters 1000 event on the 2023 ATP Tour and a WTA 1000 event on the 2023 WTA Tour. Both the men's and the women's qualifying and main draw events took place from March 6 through March 19, 2023 on outdoor hard courts at the Indian Wells Tennis Garden.

Taylor Fritz was the defending men's singles champion, but he lost to Jannik Sinner in the quarterfinals. Carlos Alcaraz defeated Daniil Medvedev to win the Indian Wells men's singles title. It was his 3rd ATP Masters title and eighth ATP title. Iga Świątek was the defending women's singles champion, but she lost to Elena Rybakina in the semifinals. Elena Rybakina defeated Aryna Sabalenka to win the Indian Wells women's singles title. It was 4th WTA title and first WTA 1000 title.

John Isner and Jack Sock were the defending men's doubles champions, Xu Yifan and Yang Zhaoxuan are the defending women's doubles champions.

Champions

Men's singles 

  Carlos Alcaraz def.  Daniil Medvedev, 6–3, 6–2

This was Alcaraz's eighth ATP Title, and second of the year.

Women's singles 

  Elena Rybakina def.  Aryna Sabalenka, 7–6(13–11), 6–4

This was Rybakina's fourth WTA Tour title, and first of the year. This was her maiden WTA 1000 title.

Men's doubles 

  Rohan Bopanna /  Matthew Ebden def.  Wesley Koolhof /  Neal Skupski, 6–3, 2–6, [10–8]

Women's doubles 

  Barbora Krejčíková /  Kateřina Siniaková def.  Beatriz Haddad Maia /  Laura Siegemund,  6–1, 6–7(3–7), [10–7]

Points and prize money

Point distribution

* Players with byes receive first round points.

Prize money
The total combined prize money for the 2023 BNP Paribas Open was $17,600,000 with each tour (ATP and WTA) playing for a share of $8,800,000. This represented a rise of 5.27% from 2022.

*

See also 
 2023 ATP Tour
 2023 WTA Tour
 ATP Tour Masters 1000
 WTA 1000 tournaments

References

External links 

 
2023 BNP Paribas Open
2023 ATP Tour
2023 WTA Tour
2023 in American tennis
March 2023 sports events in the United States
2023 in sports in California